Randy L. Bott (born 1945) is a former American professor of religion at Brigham Young University (BYU) in Provo, Utah, United States. He taught classes on missionary preparation and the Doctrine and Covenants, and wrote doctrinal and motivational literature about the Church of Jesus Christ of Latter-day Saints (LDS Church).

Biography

Education and personal life
After earning a B.S. in psychology from Utah State University, Bott earned his M.S. degree in education from the same university and an Ed.D. from BYU in 1988. Bott also speaks Samoan.

Bott has served in various capacities of the LDS Church, including bishop, high councilor, stake presidency counselor, and as a mission president in Fresno, California. Bott married Vickie Pehrson in September 1969. They had three boys and three girls, and became the grandparents of 14 children.

Professional life
Bott said in 2008 that he spent four to six hours every day answering phone calls and e-mails from his students, which "enables him to have a more personal touch with the students he teaches". At the beginning of his classes, he invites students to ask questions about missionary life, LDS Church doctrine, and personal comportment. Bott's tests, which he calls "celebrations", are open-note, open-book. In 2008, Bott taught 3,149 students at BYU, or over 10 percent of the university's student body. In 2008 Bott was the highest-rated professor in the United States on the website Ratemyprofessors.com.

In February 2012, Bott drew criticism for a quote in a Washington Post article about the LDS Church's stand on race. The LDS Church consequently issued a press release in response to the article later the same month and also posted a page titled "Race and the Priesthood" on its official website the following year.

It was announced in March 2012 that Bott would be leaving his teaching post at BYU to serve as a senior missionary with his wife, and he retired from BYU in June 2012.

Works
Bott has authored and co-authored books on missionary preparation, LDS Church doctrine, application of doctrine to life, and the writings of Joseph Smith.

Non-fiction – religious and general interest

 
 
 
 
 
 
 
 
 
 
 
 
 

Collaborations/inclusions

 
 
 

Academic

 
 

Fiction

References

External links
 Thriving in Marriage and Parenting by Keeping an Eternal Perspective, 2004 BYU Family Expo Conference address
 Bott's cameo in a BYU independent film

1945 births
20th-century Mormon missionaries
American leaders of the Church of Jesus Christ of Latter-day Saints
American Mormon missionaries in the United States
Brigham Young University alumni
Brigham Young University faculty
Living people
Mission presidents (LDS Church)
Utah State University alumni
Latter Day Saints from Utah